Communication Studies is a peer-reviewed academic journal that covers communication processes, specifically communication theory and research. It was established in 1949 as the Central States Speech Journal, obtaining its current title in 1989. The editor-in-chief is Yuping Mao (California State University, Long Beach). It is published in 6 issues a year by Routledge and is an official journal of the Central States Communication Association. The journal issues open science badges on articles meeting the criteria of the Center for Open Science.

According to data published in Scientometrics Communication Studies was rated as the fifth-most central journal to the field of human communication.

Abstracting and indexing
The journal is abstracted and indexed in EBSCO databases, Emerging Sources Citation Index, ProQuest databases, and Scopus.

Editors
The following persons are or have been editor-in-chief of the journal:

References

External links
 

Routledge academic journals
English-language journals
Publications established in 1949
Communication journals
5 times per year journals